A scam or confidence trick is an attempt to defraud a person or group by gaining their confidence.

Scam or Scams may also refer to:

Arts, entertainment, and media

Films
 Scam (film), a 1993 American TV movie
 The Scam (film), a 2009 South Korean film
 The Scam Artist, a 2004 American film

Music
 Scam (album), a 2000 album by the Screaming Jets
 "Scam" (song), a 1994 song by Jamiroquai

Television
 "The Scam", a 1986 episode of the TV sitcom Gimme a Break!
 "Scam 1992", a 2020 Indian series
 Scams (TV series), a 2019 Japanese series

Science and technology
 SCAM – Parallel SCSI Configured Automatically
 Superconducting camera
 Scientific Certainty Argumentation Method

Other uses
 SCAM Spa, an Italian truck manufacturer
 Soluble cell adhesion molecules (sCAM)
 SCAM (zine), a punk rock culture publication

See also
 
 Fraud
 Hoax
 Skam (disambiguation)